The Strangler of the Tower is a 1966 West German crime film directed by  Hans Mehringer and starring Charles Regnier, Kai Fischer and Hans Reiser.

Like the contemporaneous series of Edgar Wallace adaptations by Rialto Film, it has a British setting.

Synopsis
A Scotland Yard detective investigates the theft of a priceless Indian jewel.

Cast
 Charles Regnier as Mr. Cliften
 Kai Fischer as Grace Harrison
 Hans Reiser as Inspektor Harvey
 Ellen Schwiers as Lady Trenton
 Ady Berber as The Strangler
 Christa Linder as Jane Wilkins
 Birgit Bergen as Dodo
 Rainer Bertram as Kiddie
 Inigo Gallo as Pietro Broggini
 Gerhard Geisler as Dr. Livingstone
 Edi Huber as Masters
 Ruth Jecklin as Maisie
 Lis Kertelge as Djaipur
 Walter Kiesler as Sir Burley
 Peter W. Loosli as Travers
 Albert Mol as Larry the Glad
 Alfred Schlageter as Sir Humphry

References

Bibliography 
 Michael R. Pitts. Famous Movie Detectives III. Scarecrow Press, 2004.

External links 
 

1966 films
1966 crime films
German crime films
West German films
1960s German-language films
Films set in London
1960s German films